Christine Louise of Oettingen-Oettingen (20 March 1671 – 3 September 1747) was Duchess of Brunswick-Lüneburg. She was the maternal grandmother of Holy Roman Empress Maria Theresa, Emperor Peter II of Russia and also Charles I, Duke of Brunswick-Wolfenbüttel.

Early life
Christine Louise was born as the third daughter of Albert Ernest I, Prince of Öttingen-Öttingen (1642-1683) and his wife, Duchess Christine Friederike of Württemberg (1644-1674), daughter of Eberhard III, Duke of Württemberg and his first wife Anna Katharina, Wild- and Rheingräfin of Salm-Kyrburg (1614-1655).

Marriage
She married Louis Rudolph, Duke of Brunswick-Lüneburg at Aurich in 1690. They had four daughters, but only three reached adulthood:

 Princess Elisabeth Christine (1691–1750), married Charles VI, Holy Roman Emperor.
 Princess Charlotte Auguste (1692–1692)
 Princess Charlotte Christine (1694–1715), married Alexei Petrovich, Tsarevich of Russia, Peter the Great's son and heir.
 Antoinette Amalie, Duchess of Brunswick-Wolfenbüttel (1696–1762), who married in 1712 her cousin Prince Ferdinand Albert of Brunswick-Lüneburg, heir of her father.

The marriages of her three daughters were arranged by her ambitious father-in-law, Anthony Ulrich, Duke of Brunswick-Wolfenbüttel.

Ancestry

Sources
Christina Louise Prinzessin v.Oettingen-Oettingen
gw1.geneanet.org
wc.rootsweb.ancestry.com

1671 births
1747 deaths
House of Oettingen-Oettingen
People from Oettingen in Bayern
Duchesses of Brunswick-Wolfenbüttel
New House of Brunswick
Burials at Brunswick Cathedral